Carlos Manuel Joaquín González (born January 6, 1965) is a Mexican politician, the governor of the state of Quintana Roo. From 2009 to 2012 he served as Deputy of the LXI Legislature of the Mexican Congress representing Quintana Roo.

Life
Joaquín González was born on January 6, 1965, in Cancún, the half brother of Pedro Joaquín Coldwell, a former PRI president, senator and former Secretary of Energy. He obtained his undergraduate degree in public accounting from the Universidad Autónoma de Yucatán in 1988. Through the 1980s and 1990s, he worked for various companies; he supervised the auditing department of Hidrogenadora Yucateca, S.A. de C.V. from 1984 to 1988 and worked as an operations manager at other southeastern Mexican companies, including Aerovias Caribe, S.A. de C.V. (1988–90) and Portatel del Sureste, S.A. de C.V. (1990–2001). He also specialized in senior management at Tec de Monterrey.

In 1999, he became an active member of the PRI. He served as the treasurer of Solidaridad, Quintana Roo (the municipality containing Playa del Carmen) from 2002 to 2005 and was municipal president from 2005 to 2008. Also in 2008, he served as president of the Association of Coastal Municipalities of Mexico. For one year after leaving Solidaridad, Joaquín González became the secretary of tourism for Quintana Roo.

In 2009, Joaquín González won election to the LXI Legislature as a federal deputy representing the third district of Quintana Roo, which includes Cancún. He presided over the Tourism Commission and served on the Navy and Fishing Commissions during his three years in San Lázaro.

After his time as a federal deputy, Joaquín González was designated as Subsecretary of Operations, and later as Subsecretary of Innovation and Tourist Development, in the Secretariat of Tourism. He resigned from SECTUR in January 2016 and intended to seek the PRI's candidacy for governor of Quintana Roo for the second time; in 2010, he was defeated in the internal election by Roberto Borge, who went on to become governor.

On February 9, however, Joaquín González left the PRI after 17 years, claiming that a group within the state party led by Governor Roberto Borge was not letting him run for governor. One of his exploratory pre-campaign events was shut down by local and state officials for not notifying civil protection authorities. He would later call the state party "closed, corrupt, complicated", exclusive and discriminatory. Two days later, Joaquín González accepted the invitation of the PAN-PRD coalition to become the alliance's candidate for the gubernatorial elections, registering as a member of the latter party.

In the gubernatorial elections held on June 5, 2016, Joaquín González and the PAN-PRD alliance defeated Mauricio Góngora, the PRI candidate, by ten percentage points.

References

1965 births
Living people
Politicians from Quintana Roo
People from Cancún
Members of the Chamber of Deputies (Mexico) for Quintana Roo
Institutional Revolutionary Party politicians
Governors of Quintana Roo
21st-century Mexican politicians
Monterrey Institute of Technology and Higher Education alumni
Universidad Autónoma de Yucatán alumni
Municipal presidents in Quintana Roo
Deputies of the LXI Legislature of Mexico